The sugar-apple or sweetsop is the edible fruit of Annona squamosa, the most widely grown species of Annona and a native of tropical climate in the Americas and West Indies. Spanish traders aboard the Manila galleons docking in the Philippines brought it to Asia. The color is typically pale green through blue-green, with a deep pink blush in certain varieties, and typically has a bloom. It is unique among Annona fruits in being segmented; the segments tend to separate when ripe, exposing the interior.

The flesh is fragrant and sweet, creamy white through light yellow, and resembles and tastes like custard. It is found adhering to  seeds forming individual segments arranged in a single layer around a conical core. It is soft, slightly grainy, and slippery. The hard, shiny seeds may number 20–40 or more per fruit and have a brown to black coat, although varieties exist that are almost seedless. The seeds can be ground for use as an insecticide.

New varieties are also being developed in Taiwan and Hong Kong. The atemoya or "pineapple sugar-apple", a hybrid between the sugar-apple and the cherimoya, is popular in Taiwan, although it was first developed in the United States in 1908. The fruit is similar in sweetness to the sugar-apple, but has a very different taste. As its name suggests, it tastes like pineapple.

Nutrition and uses

Sugar-apple is high in energy, an excellent source of vitamin C and manganese, a good source of thiamine and vitamin B6, and provides vitamin B2, B3 B5, B9, iron, magnesium, phosphorus and potassium in fair quantities.

For uses of other fruit from the custard-apple genus, see:
Atemoya (a hybrid between A. squamosa and A. cherimoya)
Cherimoya
Custard-apple

Gallery

See also
 Annonin
 Atemoya
 Cherimoya
 Custard-apple
 Soursop

References

External links

Flora of North America: Annona squamosa

Fruits from Americas: Annona squamosa
Pacific Island Ecosystems at Risk: Annona squamosa
Growing Sugar Apple Annona squamosa

Annona
Edible fruits
Trees of the Caribbean 
Crops originating from the Americas
Crops originating from South America
Flora without expected TNC conservation status